Glumini is a tribe of kelp flies in the family Coelopidae.

Genera
Chaetocoelopa Malloch, 1933
Coelopina Malloch, 1933
Dasycoelopa Malloch, 1933
Gluma McAlpine, 1991
Malacomyia Haliday in Westwood, 1840 (sometimes placed in Dryomyzidae)

References

Coelopidae